The Barack Obama Foundation is a Chicago-based nonprofit organization founded in 2014. It oversees the creation of the Barack Obama Presidential Center, runs the My Brother's Keeper Alliance (a program Barack Obama began while he was president), and operates a scholarship program through the University of Chicago's Harris School of Public Policy.

History
The foundation held its inaugural summit on October 31, 2017, in Chicago. According to Barack Obama, he intends for his foundation to be central to many of his post-presidential activities, which he sees as having the potential to be more consequential than his time in the White House. In 2018, contributions and in-kind gifts totaled $164.8 million, according to its filed annual report in June 2019— a drop of $67.8 million from the $232.6 million raised in 2017.

The foundation's first president was Adewale Adeyemo, an Economist and former Deputy National Security Adviser for International Economic Affairs who joined in August 2019. In 2020, President-elect Joe Biden selected Adeyemo to serve as Deputy Secretary of the Treasury, and he was replaced by Valerie Jarrett.

Barack Obama Presidential Center

The foundation's major project  is to oversee the creation of the planned presidential library of former president Obama. In May 2015, the foundation, along with Chicago mayor Rahm Emanuel, announced the development of the center and its location in the Jackson Park neighborhood of Chicago's South Side. The planning process met with criticism from some local leaders who questioned the benefit for the surrounding area and did not feel the community was sufficiently involved. On February 26, 2019, Chicago residents voted to require a community benefits agreement in order to make the Center official, something to which the Obama Foundation has objected.

Updated plans were released in 2019, with some changes based on feedback. The complex includes four buildings, with a museum, public space, public library branch, and athletic center. It was designed by the architectural firm Tod Williams Billie Tsien.

, the center is set to begin construction sometime in 2021.

My Brother's Keeper Alliance
The My Brother's Keeper Alliance (MBK Alliance) is a program inspired by President Obama's My Brother's Keeper Challenge that he started through the White House in 2014. Its purpose is to address challenges and opportunity gaps that boys and young men of color face, providing support through mentoring, education, job training, and other activities. In 2017, MBK Alliance was moved into the Obama Foundation.

Scholarships
In February 2018 the foundation announced it had begun a scholarship program at the University of Chicago. The scholarships are awarded to 25 American and international master's students in the Harris School of Public Policy in an effort to cultivate leadership through the Presidential Center. It covers the students' tuition and living expenses while they work with the foundation and take classes. It also began sponsoring fellowships called Obama Foundation Scholars at Columbia University, Obama's alma mater. In its first year, 2018, the non-degree-granting program paid the expenses and provided a stipend for 12 international students.

In May 2022, The Obama Foundation announced a $100 million gift from Airbnb co-founder and CEO Brian Chesky. The gift was to launch a new scholarship program for students pursuing careers in public services. The Voyager Scholarship aka The Obama-Chesky Scholarship for Public Service aims to support students in their junior and senior years of college with up to 50,000 in financial aid, a $10,000 stipend and free Airbnb housing to pursue a summer work-travel experience between their junior and senior years of college; a $2,000 travel credit every year for 10 years following graduation; an annual summit; and a network of mentors. On September 12, 2022 the inaugural cohort of 100 "Voyagers" was announced. The inaugural cohort represents 36 US states and territories as well as 70 US colleges and universities. Barack Obama and Brian Chesky surprised the 2022 cohort via Zoom call to share insights into their public service journeys and to congratulate the students on their selection.

References

External links

501(c)(3) organizations
Barack Obama
2014 establishments in Illinois
Organizations based in Chicago